Papua New Guinea will compete at the 2022 World Aquatics Championships in Budapest, Hungary from 18 June to 3 July.

Swimming

Papua New Guinean swimmer has achieved qualifying standards in the following events.

References

Nations at the 2022 World Aquatics Championships
Papua New Guinea at the World Aquatics Championships
2022 in Papua New Guinean sport